Nitrogen fixation or Biological Nitrogen Fixation (BNF) is a chemical process by which molecular nitrogen, which has a strong triple covalent bond, is converted into ammonia or related nitrogenous compounds, typically in soil or aquatic systems  but also in industry. The nitrogen in air is molecular dinitrogen, a relatively nonreactive molecule that is metabolically useless to all but a few microorganisms. Biological nitrogen fixation or diazotrophy is an important microbe-mediated process that converts dinitrogen (N2) gas to ammonia (NH3) using the nitrogenase protein complex (Nif).

Nitrogen fixation is essential to life because fixed inorganic nitrogen compounds are required for the biosynthesis of all nitrogen-containing organic compounds, such as amino acids and proteins, nucleoside triphosphates and nucleic acids. As part of the nitrogen cycle, it is essential for agriculture and the manufacture of fertilizer. It is also, indirectly, relevant to the manufacture of all nitrogen chemical compounds, which includes some explosives, pharmaceuticals, and dyes.

Nitrogen fixation is carried out naturally in soil by microorganisms termed diazotrophs that include bacteria, such as Azotobacter, and archaea. Some nitrogen-fixing bacteria have symbiotic relationships with plant groups, especially legumes. Looser non-symbiotic relationships between diazotrophs and plants are often referred to as associative, as seen in nitrogen fixation on rice roots. Nitrogen fixation occurs between some termites and fungi. It occurs naturally in the air by means of NOx production by lightning.

All biological reactions involving the process of nitrogen fixation are catalyzed by enzymes called nitrogenases. These enzymes contain iron, often with a second metal, usually molybdenum but sometimes vanadium.

History

Biological nitrogen fixation was discovered by Jean-Baptiste Boussingault in 1838.

"The protracted investigations of the relation of plants to the acquisition of nitrogen begun by Saussure, Ville, Lawes and Gilbert and others culminated in the discovery of symbiotic fixation by Hellriegel and Wilfarth in 1887."

"Experiments by Bossingault in 1855 and Pugh, Gilbert & Lawes in 1887 had shown that nitrogen did not enter the plant directly. The discovery of the role of nitrogen fixing bacteria by Herman Hellriegel and Herman Wilfarth in 1886-8 would open a new era of soil science."

In 1901 Beijerinck showed that Azotobacter chroococcum was able to fix atmospheric nitrogen. This was the first species of the azotobacter genus, so-named by him. It is also the first known diazotroph, species that use diatomic nitrogen as a step in the complete nitrogen cycle.

Biological 
Biological nitrogen fixation (BNF) occurs when atmospheric nitrogen is converted to ammonia by a nitrogenase enzyme. The overall reaction for BNF is:

N2 + 16ATP + 16H2O + 8e- + 8H+ -> 2NH3 +H2 + 16ADP + 16

The conversion of  into ammonia occurs at a metal cluster called FeMoco, an abbreviation for the iron-molybdenum cofactor. The mechanism proceeds via a series of protonation and reduction steps wherein the FeMoco active site hydrogenates the  substrate. In free-living diazotrophs, nitrogenase-generated ammonia is assimilated into glutamate through the glutamine synthetase/glutamate synthase pathway. The microbial nif genes required for nitrogen fixation are widely distributed in diverse environments.

For example, decomposing wood, which generally has a low nitrogen content, has been shown to host a diazotrophic community. The bacteria enrich the wood substrate with nitrogen through fixation, thus enabling deadwood decomposition by fungi.

Nitrogenases are rapidly degraded by oxygen. For this reason, many bacteria cease production of the enzyme in the presence of oxygen. Many nitrogen-fixing organisms exist only in anaerobic conditions, respiring to draw down oxygen levels, or binding the oxygen with a protein such as leghemoglobin.

Importance of nitrogen 

Atmospheric nitrogen is inaccessible to most organisms, because its triple covalent bond is very strong. Most take up fixed nitrogen from various sources. For every 100 atoms of carbon, roughly 2 to 20 atoms of nitrogen are assimilated. The atomic ratio of carbon (C) : nitrogen (N) : phosphorus (P) observed on average in planktonic biomass was originally described by Alfred Redfield, who determined the stoichiometric relationship between C:N:P atoms, The Redfield Ratio, to be 106:16:1.

Nitrogenase 

The protein complex nitrogenase is responsible for catalyzing the reduction of nitrogen gas (N2) to ammonia (NH3). In Cyanobacteria, this enzyme system is housed in a specialized cell called the heterocyst. The production of the nitrogenase complex is genetically regulated, and the activity of the protein complex is dependent on ambient oxygen concentrations, and intra- and extracellular concentrations of ammonia and oxidized nitrogen species (nitrate and nitrite). Additionally, the combined concentrations of both ammonium and nitrate are thought to inhibit NFix, specifically when intracellular concentrations of 2-oxoglutarate (2-OG) exceed a critical threshold. The specialized heterocyst cell  is necessary for the performance of  nitrogenase as a result of its sensitivity to ambient oxygen.

Nitrogenase consist of two proteins, a catalytic iron-dependent protein, commonly referred to as MoFe protein and a reducing iron-only protein (Fe protein). There are three different iron dependent proteins, molybdenum-dependent, vanadium-dependent, and iron-only, with all three nitrogenase protein variations containing an iron protein component. Molybdenum-dependent nitrogenase is the most commonly present nitrogenase. The different types of nitrogenase can be determined by the specific iron protein component. Nitrogenase is highly conserved. Gene expression through DNA sequencing can distinguish which protein complex is present in the microorganism and potentially being expressed. Most frequently, the nifH gene is used to identify the presence of molybdenum-dependent nitrogenase, followed by closely related nitrogenase reductases (component II) vnfH and anfH representing vanadium-dependent and iron-only nitrogenase, respectively. In studying the ecology and evolution of nitrogen-fixing bacteria, the nifH gene is the biomarker most widely used. nifH has two similar genes anfH and vnfH that also encode for the nitrogenase reductase component of the nitrogenase complex.

Microorganisms

Diazotrophs are widespread within domain Bacteria including cyanobacteria (e.g. the highly significant Trichodesmium and Cyanothece), green sulfur bacteria, Azotobacteraceae, rhizobia and Frankia.  Several obligately anaerobic bacteria fix nitrogen including many (but not all) Clostridium spp. Some archaea such as Methanosarcina acetivorans also fix nitrogen,. and several other methanogenic taxa, are significant contributors to nitrogen fixation in oxygen-deficient soils.

Cyanobacteria, commonly known as blue-green algae, inhabit nearly all illuminated environments on Earth and play key roles in the carbon and nitrogen cycle of the biosphere. In general, cyanobacteria can use various inorganic and organic sources of combined nitrogen, such as nitrate, nitrite, ammonium, urea, or some amino acids. Several cyanobacteria strains are also capable of diazotrophic growth, an ability that may have been present in their last common ancestor in the Archean eon. Nitrogen fixation not only naturally occurs in soils but also aquatic systems, including both freshwater and marine. Indeed, the amount of nitrogen fixed in the ocean is at least as much as that on land. The colonial marine cyanobacterium Trichodesmium is thought to fix nitrogen on such a scale that it accounts for almost half of the nitrogen fixation in marine systems globally. Marine surface lichens and non-photosynthetic bacteria belonging in Proteobacteria and Planctomycetes fixate significant atmospheric nitrogen. Species of nitrogen fixing cyanobacteria in fresh waters include: Aphanizomenon and Dolichospermum (previously Anabaena). Such species have specialized cells called heterocytes, in which nitrogen fixation occurs via the nitrogenase enzyme.

Root nodule symbioses

Legume family

Plants that contribute to nitrogen fixation include those of the legume family—Fabaceae— with taxa such as kudzu, clover, soybean, alfalfa, lupin, peanut and rooibos. They contain symbiotic rhizobia bacteria within nodules in their root systems, producing nitrogen compounds that help the plant to grow and compete with other plants. When the plant dies, the fixed nitrogen is released, making it available to other plants; this helps to fertilize the soil. The great majority of legumes have this association, but a few genera (e.g., Styphnolobium) do not. In many traditional farming practices, fields are rotated through various types of crops, which usually include one consisting mainly or entirely of clover.

Fixation efficiency in soil is dependent on many factors, including the legume and air and soil conditions.

Non-leguminous 

The ability to fix nitrogen in nodules is present in actinorhizal plants such as alder and bayberry, with the help of Frankia bacteria. They are found in 25 genera in the orders Cucurbitales, Fagales and Rosales, which together with the Fabales form a nitrogen-fixing clade of eurosids. The ability to fix nitrogen is not universally present in these families. For example, of 122 Rosaceae genera, only four fix nitrogen. Fabales were the first lineage to branch off this nitrogen-fixing clade; thus, the ability to fix nitrogen may be plesiomorphic and subsequently lost in most descendants of the original nitrogen-fixing plant; however, it may be that the basic genetic and physiological requirements were present in an incipient state in the most recent common ancestors of all these plants, but only evolved to full function in some of them.

In addition, Trema (Parasponia), a tropical genus in the family Cannabaceae, is unusually able to interact with rhizobia and form nitrogen-fixing nodules.

Other plant symbionts 
Some other plants live in association with a cyanobiont (cyanobacteria such as Nostoc) which fix nitrogen for them:
 Some lichens such as Lobaria and Peltigera
 Mosquito fern (Azolla species)
 Cycads
Gunnera
Blasia (liverwort)
 Hornworts

Some symbiotic relationships involving agriculturally-important plants are:
 Sugarcane and unclear endophytes
 Foxtail millet and Azospirillum brasilense
 Kallar grass and Azoarcus sp. strain BH72 
 Rice and Herbaspirillum seropedicae
 Wheat and Klebsiella pneumoniae
 Maize landrace 'Sierra Mixe' / 'olotón' and various Bacteroidota and Pseudomonadota

Industrial processes

Historical
A method for nitrogen fixation was first described by Henry Cavendish in 1784 using electric arcs reacting nitrogen and oxygen in air. This method was implemented in the Birkeland–Eyde process of 1903. The fixation of nitrogen by lightning is a very similar natural occurring process.

The possibility that atmospheric nitrogen reacts with certain chemicals was first observed by Desfosses in 1828. He observed that mixtures of alkali metal oxides and carbon react with nitrogen at high temperatures. With the use of barium carbonate as starting material, the first commercial process became available in the 1860s, developed by Margueritte and Sourdeval. The resulting barium cyanide reacts with steam, yielding ammonia. In 1898 Frank and Caro developed what is known as the Frank–Caro process to fix nitrogen in the form of calcium cyanamide. The process was eclipsed by the Haber process, which was discovered in 1909.

Haber process

The dominant industrial method for producing ammonia is the Haber process also known as the Haber-Bosch process. Fertilizer production is now the largest source of human-produced fixed nitrogen in the terrestrial ecosystem. Ammonia is a required precursor to fertilizers, explosives, and other products. The Haber process requires high pressures (around 200 atm) and high temperatures (at least 400 °C), which are routine conditions for industrial catalysis. This process uses natural gas as a hydrogen source and air as a nitrogen source. The ammonia product has resulted in an intensification of nitrogen fertilizer globally and is credited with supporting the expansion of the human population from around 2 billion in the early 20th century to roughly 8 billion people now.

Homogeneous catalysis 

Much research has been conducted on the discovery of catalysts for nitrogen fixation, often with the goal of lowering energy requirements. However, such research has thus far failed to approach the efficiency and ease of the Haber process. Many compounds react with atmospheric nitrogen to give dinitrogen complexes. The first dinitrogen complex to be reported was 2+. Some soluble complexes do catalyze nitrogen fixation.

Lightning

Nitrogen can be fixed by lightning converting nitrogen gas and oxygen gas in the atmosphere into  (nitrogen oxides). The  molecule is highly stable and nonreactive due to the triple bond between the nitrogen atoms. Lightning produces enough energy and heat to break this bond allowing nitrogen atoms to react with oxygen, forming . When these acids seep into the soil, they make  (nitrate), which is of use to plants.

See also 
 Birkeland–Eyde process: an industrial fertilizer production process
 Carbon fixation
 Denitrification: an organic process of nitrogen release
 George Washington Carver: an American botanist
 Heterocyst
 Nitrification: biological production of nitrogen
 Nitrogen cycle: the flow and transformation of nitrogen through the environment
 Nitrogen deficiency
 Nitrogen fixation package for quantitative measurement of nitrogen fixation by plants
 Nitrogenase: enzymes used by organisms to fix nitrogen
 Ostwald process: a chemical process for making nitric acid

References

External links 
 
 
 Science History Institute Digital Collections (Photographs depicting numerous stages of the nitrogen fixation process and the various equipment and apparatus used in the production of atmospheric nitrogen, including generators, compressors, filters, thermostats, and vacuum and blast furnaces).
"Proposed Process for the Fixation of Atmospheric Nitrogen", historical perspective, Scientific American, 13 July 1878, p. 21
A global ocean snapshot of nitrogen fixers by matching sequences to cells in the Tara Ocean

Nitrogen cycle
Metabolism
Plant physiology
Soil biology